WKDC-LD, virtual and UHF digital channel 50, is a Daystar owned-and-operated television station located in Columbia, South Carolina, United States. The station is owned by the Word of God Fellowship, Inc. subsidiary of the Daystar Television Network. WKDC-LD maintains transmitter facilities located near Arlington Heights.

Digital television

Digital channels

References

External links

KDC-LD
Television channels and stations established in 1995
1995 establishments in South Carolina
Low-power television stations in the United States
Daystar (TV network) affiliates